Samanta Soares (born 16 July 1993) is a Brazilian judoka.

She is the silver medallist of the 2018 Judo Grand Prix The Hague in the -78 kg category.

References

External links
 

1993 births
Living people
Brazilian female judoka
21st-century Brazilian women
20th-century Brazilian women